"Johnny Come Home" is a song by British band Fine Young Cannibals, released as the first single from their debut album, Fine Young Cannibals (1985). It is similar to the style of many other of the band's hits, a mixture of rock and ska with Roland Gift's distinctive vocals, as well as a jazz-type trumpet solo. It was released in 1985 and was one of the group's most popular hits. The song tells the gritty realistic story of a runaway youth, and alternates from the first-person narrative, explaining how his arrival in the big city has not turned out as he expected, to the view of the parents in the chorus, expressing their wish that he would come home.

Chart performance
Although it failed to reach the top 40 in the United States, stalling at No. 76, along with the track, "Blue", "Johnny Come Home" reached No. 9 on the dance chart. The track was a good start for the group in their native United Kingdom, peaking at No. 8 on the UK Singles Chart in July 1985.

Charts

Popular culture
In later years the song's title would serve as the title for a Jake Arnott novel published in 2006 whose plot line is reminiscent of the themes discussed in the song.

References

1985 debut singles
Fine Young Cannibals songs
1985 songs
Songs written by David Steele (musician)
Songs written by Roland Gift
London Records singles